The 1917 Grand National was cancelled because Aintree Racecourse was taken over by the War Office. However, a substitute race known as the War Steeplechase was held at Gatwick Racecourse. The Gatwick races from 1916 to 1918 are typically omitted from the true Grand National records.

The 1917 War Steeplechase was won by Ballymacad, ridden by jockey Edmund Driscoll and trained by Aubrey Hastings.

Limerock ridden by Bill Smith was clear on the run-in when he collapsed yards from the winning post, similar to Devon Loch in 1956

Finishing Order

Non-finishers

References

http://www.grand-national.net/gatwick.htm

 1917
Grand National
Grand National
20th century in Sussex